Juncus textilis is a species of rush known by the common name basket rush. It is endemic to California, where it grows along the coast and in the coastal mountain ranges of the southern half of the state.

Description
The stems are cylindrical with faint longitudinal grooves. The leaves lack blades and appear as small brown sheaths around the base of the stems.

The long, bushy inflorescence arises from the side of the stem and splits into long branches bearing clusters of many flowers. Each flower is cupped by small, clear bractlets and has pointed greenish brown tepals. There are six stamens with large anthers. The fruit is a dark brown, shiny capsule.

Uses
This species of rush has been used historically for basket weaving by several Native American peoples of southern California, such as the Cahuilla, Kumeyaay, and Chumash, among others.

Juncus textilis is an important plant endemic to California; Chumash people use it today for basket-making as they have been for centuries.

The rush was [sic] valued for its varied colors, from deep red to sun-dried tan; the stems were [sic] dyed black with sea plants such as Suaeda species and yellow with Psorothamnus emoryi.

The tassels atop the rushes can be shaken for seeds, which can be eaten like grains. In springtime, the tender white bases can be eaten as emergency rations.

References

External links
Calflora Database: Juncus textilis (basket rush)
 Jepson Manual eFlora (TJM2) treatment of Juncus textilis
University of Michigan at Dearborn: Native American Ethnobotany of Juncus textilis
Flora of North America
Juncus textilis — U.C. Photo gallery

textilis
Edible plants
Endemic flora of California
Natural history of the California chaparral and woodlands
Natural history of the California Coast Ranges
Natural history of the Channel Islands of California
Natural history of the Peninsular Ranges
Natural history of the Santa Monica Mountains
Natural history of the Transverse Ranges
Plants described in 1903
Flora without expected TNC conservation status